The men's 300 metre free rifle was one of the five sport shooting events on the Shooting at the 1896 Summer Olympics programme. The second rifle event and last of the shooting events, the free rifle was begun on 11 April. Each marksman fired 40 shots, in four strings of ten. 25 men entered the event, though only 20 actually competed. They represented three nations. Frangoudis led after the first day, but when the event was continued on 12 April, Orphanidis took the lead and held on to win first place. He hit the target 37 times.

Background

This was the only appearance of the men's 300 metre free rifle event without position requirements. A three-positions event would be introduced in 1900 (along with team and individual position medals) and held 11 times between then and 1972.

Competition format

The competition had each shooter fire 40 shots, in 4 strings of 10, at a range of 300 metres. Scoring involved multiplying target hits by points scored in each string.

Schedule

The free rifle was the last of the shooting events, starting in the afternoon of day 6 of competition. It went until it was too dark to shoot, then was postponed until the next morning. It finished at 1 p.m. on Sunday. Precise start times for each session are not known.

Results

References

  (Digitally available at )
  (Excerpt available at )
 

Men's rifle free
Men's 300m any 1896